Frank Marion may refer to:

 Frank J. Marion (1870–1963), American motion picture pioneer
 Frank Marion (American football) (born 1951), American football player